Luca Petrungaro (born 30 January 2000) is an Italian footballer who plays as a forward for  club AlbinoLeffe.

Career

Early career
In February 2017, reported interest was shown in Petrungaro by Manchester City and Red Bull Salzburg, although a move never materialized. In September 2018, Petrungaro moved to Torino's youth system after falling out of favor in Rome.

AlbinoLeffe
Prior to the 2019–20 season, Petrungaro moved to Serie C club AlbinoLeffe, with Torino incorporating a buy back clause into the contract. He made his league debut for the club on 29 September 2019, coming on as a 77th minute substitute for Francesco Gelli in a 1–0 away defeat to Novara.

References

External links

2000 births
Living people
U.C. AlbinoLeffe players
Serie C players
Italian footballers
Italy youth international footballers
Association football forwards
Footballers from Rome
21st-century Italian people